by Duplex! is the debut album from Canadian kids' band Duplex!.

Track listing
 "Yr Mama"
 "Hanu"
 "Salad Song"
 "Best Little Boy"
 "Mr Slim"
 "Multiplication Treehouse"
 "Figure 8"
 "Freaky Rhesus"
 "I AM A ROBOT"
 "DNA Angle"
 "Dear Emily"
 "Lookit me!"
 "Nucat"
 "Camels in the Desert"
 "Bethlehem"
 "Lament of the House Rabbit"
 "Heatin' up the milk"
 "Pooing and peeing"

References

2005 debut albums
Duplex! albums
Mint Records albums